Over church may refer to:

Overchurch, a parish containing Upton, Merseyside, England
St Chad's Church, Over, in Winsford, Cheshire, England
St Mary's Church, in Over, Cambridgeshire, England

See also
Over (disambiguation)